Doug Mattis (April 26, 1966 – February 9, 2023) was an American figure skater. He was the 1985 Grand Prix International St. Gervais champion, 1985 Nebelhorn Trophy silver medalist, 1986 Novarat Trophy silver medalist, and 1985 U.S. national junior champion.

Life and career 
Mattis was born on April 26, 1966 in Philadelphia, PA. He won the junior men's title at the 1985 U.S. Championships.

From 1986 to 1991, Mattis competed in the senior men's division at the U.S. Championships. He won three international medals — gold at the 1985 Grand Prix International St. Gervais in France, silver at the 1985 Nebelhorn Trophy in Germany, and silver at the 1986 Novarat Trophy in Hungary. He never included the triple Axel in competition, having a low success rate in practice, but did perform a one-footed back flip. In the later years of his Olympic-eligible career, he was coached by Robin Cousins and Frank Carroll. He received financial support from the Foundation for International Ice Skating Advancement. In the 1990–91 season, he also trained in pair skating, partnering Liberte Sheldon under the guidance of Irina Rodnina.

Mattis retired from amateur competition at the 1991 U.S. Championships, where he finished 13th. He then competed in professional events, including the U.S. Open Championships and World Professional Championships in Jaca, Spain. He worked as a choreographer and coach. He supported the Young Artists Showcase at the American Ice Theater.

His programs included Hypnotized, Imitation, Nightmare/It's No Good, and Can't Cry Hard Enough.

Mattis was openly gay and performed an exhibition at the 1994 Gay Games in New York. He died on February 9, 2023, at the age of 56.

Competitive highlights

Professional career

References 

1960s births
2023 deaths
American male single skaters
LGBT rights activists
LGBT figure skaters
American LGBT sportspeople